Kateh Khurteh-ye Pain (also Romanized as Kateh Khūrteh-ye Pā’īn) is a village in Lat Leyl Rural District, Otaqvar District, Langarud County, Gilan Province, Iran. At the 2006 census, its population was 53, in 15 families.

References 

Populated places in Langarud County